The following is a complete list of Grands Prix which have been a part of the FIM Speedway Grand Prix since its inception in 1995.

Current 

 Speedway Grand Prix of Czech Republic (1997–)
 Speedway Grand Prix of Denmark (1995–)
 Speedway Grand Prix of Germany (1995–1998, 2001, 2007–2008, 2016-)
 Speedway Grand Prix of Great Britain (1995–)
 Speedway Grand Prix of Poland (1995–)
 Speedway Grand Prix of Russia (2021–)
 Speedway Grand Prix of Scandinavia (2002–)
 Speedway Grand Prix of Sweden (1995–)

Former

 Speedway Grand Prix of Australia (2002, 2015-2017)
 Speedway Grand Prix of Austria (1995)
 Speedway Grand Prix of Croatia (2010-2012)
 Speedway Grand Prix of Europe (2000, 2002–2014)
 Speedway Grand Prix of Finland (2014-2015)
 Speedway Grand Prix of Italy (1996, 2005-2013)
 Speedway Grand Prix of Latvia (2006-2009, 2013-2015, 2017)
 Speedway Grand Prix of New Zealand (2012–2014)
 Speedway Grand Prix of Nordic (2009–2014)
 Speedway Grand Prix of Norway (2002–2004)
 Speedway Grand Prix of Slovenia (2002–2009, 2013, 2015-2019)

References

See also 

 
Motorsport-related lists